Lonchocarpus phaseolifolius is a species of plant in the family Fabaceae. It is found in Costa Rica, El Salvador, Guatemala, Honduras, and Nicaragua.

References

phaseolifolius
Flora of Central America
Critically endangered plants
Taxonomy articles created by Polbot